The Indonesian Community Shield was a pre-season football competition held the week before the season begins in Indonesia every year. It was contested by the winners of the Indonesia Super League/Indonesian Premier League and Piala Indonesia in the previous season, as a curtain raiser to the new season. If the same team wins both Indonesian League and Piala Indonesia, then the Community Shield is contested by the League winners and the Piala Indonesia runners-up.

The current holders are Semen Padang, who defeated Persibo Bojonegoro 4–1 in the 2013 edition. Piala Indonesia was not held in many years so that the Indonesian Community Shield is not held for the season.

History 
Between 1990 and 1992, PSSI held tournaments that functioned similarly as the Indonesian Community Shield.

In 1990, the Piala Utama (English: The Premier Cup) was established as an official tournament founded and organized by PSSI. This competition brings together each of the four best clubs from the two PSSI main competitions in the final standings of the preceiding season of Galatama and Perserikatan. The eight clubs from the two competitions are mixed and divided into two groups. Each group is filled by two Galatama clubs and two Perserikatan clubs. In the group system, the tournament plays a half competition system where each participant plays three matches. Winner and Runner Up from each group will advance to the last four. Persebaya Surabaya won the tournament in 1990, while the second tournament in 1992 was won by Pelita Jaya.

Predecessors of Community Shield

Piala Utama

Winners

Performance by club

References 

 
National association football supercups